Selouane (Tarifit: Seřwan, ⵙⴻⵔⵡⴰⵏ; Arabic: سلوان) is a town in Nador Province, Oriental, Morocco. According to the 2004 census, it has a population of 9,211.

References

Populated places in Nador Province